Chain fern is a common name for several ferns and may refer to:

Woodwardia, a fern genus of the Northern Hemisphere
Tmesipteris, a fern genus of the South Pacific, also called "hanging fork fern"

Ferns